Audience risers are elevated platforms for people.  The origin of the audience riser can be dated back to original amphitheaters.

Differences from Bleachers
Audience risers are different from bleachers in that the seats for bleachers are integrated into the structure itself; audience risers are primarily platforms first, to which a variety of chairs, tables, cameras, spot lights, etc. may be used on.  While bleachers provide fixed aisle ways and may not provide a solid floor, audience risers are designed so that each level presents a flat, unbroken surface.

Configurations
Audience risers may be configured to hold convention seating, theater seating, classroom table seating or dinner table seating.  Although primarily rectangular in overall shape, audience risers may include angled or curved sections as space allows.

Construction
Audience risers may be temporary (purpose-built) or a permanent part of a facility.
Audience risers are primarily constructed using stage decks, although construction with lumber & framing is not uncommon.

Usage
Audience risers are widely used in the Corporate Events industry to provide elevated seating for attendees.
The most common venues for audience risers are convention centers, resorts, and other business travel destinations.

Furniture